Valle is one of the 18 departments into which Honduras is divided.

The departmental capital is Nacaome. The department faces the Gulf of Fonseca and contains mangrove swamps; inland, it is very hot and dry.

The department covers a total surface area of 1,665 km² and, in 2015, had an estimated population of 178,561 people.

Valle Department was organized in 1893.

Municipalities

 Alianza
 Amapala
 Aramecina
 Caridad
 Goascorán
 Langue
 Nacaome
 San Francisco de Coray
 San Lorenzo

References

 
Departments of Honduras
States and territories established in 1893